Mesotaenium is a genus of algae belonging to the family Mesotaeniaceae.

The species of this genus are found in Europe and Northern America.

Species:

Mesotaenium caldariorum 
Mesotaenium chlamydosporum 
Mesotaenium degreyi 
Mesotaenium endlicherianum 
Mesotaenium fusisporum 
Mesotaenium kramstae 
Mesotaenium macrococcum 
Mesotaenium minimum 
Mesotaenium mirificum 
Mesotaenium obscurum

References

Zygnematales
Charophyta genera